Tetuin is a flavone, a type of flavonoid. It is the 6-O-glucoside of baicalein. It can be isolated from the seeds of Oroxylum indicum, the Indian trumpetflower, known as टेटु tetu in Marathi.

References

 

Flavone glucosides
Resorcinols